Long Ping is an MTR  station located in the northern part of Yuen Long Town to the southeast of Long Ping Estate, in the New Territories of Hong Kong. The station is elevated over Yuen Long Nullah with two public transport interchanges on the northeast and south sides. There is also cycle parking nearby. There is also a network of footbridges connecting the station to Long Ping Estate, Yuen Long Plaza and other nearby housing estates.

History
Long Ping and Yuen Long stations were built under a combined contract, numbered CC-202, which was awarded to the AMEC-Hong Kong Construction Joint Venture. The contract, worth HK$1.76 billion, commenced in September 1999. A topping-out ceremony for both stations was held on 24 May 2002.

The station opened on 20 December 2003 with the inauguration of the West Rail.

Hence, Long Ping was included in the project and is now an intermediate station on the Tuen Ma line.

Station layout

Platforms 1 and 2 share the same island platform.

Entrances/exits
 A: Wang Lok Street 
 B1: Ping Shun Street
 B2: Long Ping Estate 
 C: Po Lok Square
 D: Po Fai Path
 E: Tai Kiu Tsuen
 F: Tung Tau Industrial Area, Yue Fung Industrial Building

References 

MTR stations in the New Territories
West Rail line
Tuen Ma line
Yuen Long District
Former Kowloon–Canton Railway stations
Railway stations in Hong Kong opened in 2003